A Uruguayan passport is an identity document issued to Uruguayan citizens to travel outside Uruguay. For traveling in Mercosur countries, as well as Chile and Bolivia, Uruguayan citizens may use their ID card..  For naturalised legal citizens, the nationality of origin will still apply as Uruguayan nationality law currently doesn't give nationality to naturalised citizens, which may mean a visa is still required when travelling.

The Uruguayan Ministry of the Interior has issued the biometric passport to Uruguayan citizens since 16 October 2015. The new passport complies with the standards set forth by the Visa Waiver Program of the United States. Standard processing time is 20 business days; however, 48-hour urgent processing is available for a higher fee.

As of 19 July 2022, Uruguayan nationals had visa-free or visa on arrival access to 153 countries and territories, ranking the Uruguayan passport 28th in terms of travel freedom (tied with the Emirati passport) according to the Henley Passport Index.

See also
 List of passports
 Visa requirements for Uruguayan citizens

External links
DNIC (Dirección Nacional de Identificación Civil | Ministerio del Interior) - Pasaporte

References

 Council regulation 539/2001 
 Council regulation 1932/2006 
 Council regulation 539/2001 consolidated version, 19.1.2007 

Uruguay
Government of Uruguay
Mercosur passports